FC Clifton Hill also known as Clifton Hill FC are an association football club which currently plays in the Victorian State League Division 1, the 3rd tier of Association football in Victoria and the 4th tier in Australia. They were founded in 1975.

History
Founded in 1975 Clifton Hill FC has had much success over the years, moving up through district (League winners 1976) and provisional leagues competitions, before finally hitting the Victorian State League Division 2 in 1999. They moved all over the place through the conference style division, before finally achieving promotion to the Victorian State League Division 1 in 2007 after winning the Division 2 championship that season.

Promotion day ensued amidst a carnival atmosphere with Clifton Hill's final game of the season held over to a stand-alone Saturday given weather the weekend prior. Fans flew in from all over the land to dine on Australia's finest souvlaki and hamburgers and watch Clifton Hill rout their hapless opponents 7–0, in the process consigning rivals  Banyule, to yet another season in Div 2.

Team Mascot

Club song
Oh we're from Clifton Hill,
a fighting fury we're from Clifton Hill,
in any weather you will see us with a grin,
risking head and shin,
if we're behind, we'll never mind,
we'll fight and fight and win,

Oh we're from Clifton Hill,
we never weaken til the final whistle blows,
like the Hillmen of old,
we're strong and we're bold,
oh we're from Clifton
the blue AND the white
oh we're from Clifton Hill!

Club Ties
The club maintains tenuous links to Crystal Palace via a bi-annual Australian based supporters trip.

Sadly after 7 years without loss in front of these loyal fans, season 2013 bore witness to a 0–1 loss to Noble Park. The supporters trip has now not seen CHU score for in excess of 300 minutes.

There is also a mutual relationship with Heidelberg United due to the Greek Heritage of both clubs.

Current Senior Squad

(Captain)

Honors
 VSF District League 2 Winners 1976  Hellenic Cup – Runners Up:  1985, 1992.

References

External links
 Information
 Information
 Information

Soccer clubs in Melbourne
Victorian State League teams
Association football clubs established in 1975
1975 establishments in Australia
Sport in the City of Yarra